The 2013 Irani Cup, also called 2013 Irani Trophy, was the 51st season of the Irani Cup, a first-class cricket competition in India. It was a one-off match which was played from 6 February 2013 to 10 February 2013 between the 2012–13 Ranji champions Mumbai and the Rest of India team. Wankhede Stadium, the home ground of Mumbai, hosted the match. The match was drawn and Rest of India retained the Irani Cup by virtue of their first innings lead.

Squads

Lead-up
Mumbai captain Ajit Agarkar was ruled out of the Irani Cup due to a groin injury. Allrounder Abhishek Nayar was named the captain of the side.

A stomach bug forced the RoI captain Virender Sehwag to sit out for the match, and Harbhajan Singh lead the team instead.

Scorecard

Innings 1

Fall of wickets: 1–144 (Dhawan, 38.1 ov), 2–222 (Tiwary, 58.6 ov), 3–231 (Vijay, 62.6 ov), 4–309 (Rayudu, 83.2 ov), 5–330 (Saha, 88.5 ov), 6–352 (Harbhajan, 94.4 ov), 7–505 (Mithun, 122.4 ov), 8–506 (Ojha, 123.6 ov), 9–512 (Raina, 124.4 ov), 10–526 (Pandey, 130.1 ov)

Innings 2

Fall of wickets: 1–14 (Tare, 3.3 ov), 2–146 (Jaffer, 39.2 ov), 3–161 (Thakur, 44.1 ov), 4–234 (Rahane, 64.5 ov), 5–254 (Sharma, 70.4 ov), 6–257 (Nayar, 73.4 ov), 7–360 (Chavan, 99.4 ov), 8–399 (Kulkarni, 110.4 ov), 9–409 (Khan, 113.5 ov), 10–409 (Dabholkar, 114.1 ov)

Innings 3

Fall of wickets: 1–0 (Dhawan, 0.6 ov), 2–55 (Sreesanth, 17.6 ov), 3–67 (Vijay, 23.1 ov), 4–207 (Tiwary, 72.2 ov), 5–352 (Raina, 106.5 ov)

Innings 4 

Fall of Wickets:1-36 (Tare, 13.3 ov), 2-89 (Rahane, 27.3 ov), 3-104 (Sharma, 30.3 ov), 4-123 (Nayar 41.5 ov)

Result: Match Drawn; Rest of India won on 1st innings

References

External links
Irani Cup
Irani cup 2012–13

Irani Cup
Irani Cup